Blue Line Express (Sinhala: රාජධානි එක්ස්ප්‍රස් Rajadhani Ekspras) is a train service provider in Sri Lanka, a part of Blue Line Company.  Blue  Line Express provides premium services on several routes in Sri Lanka, in partnership with Sri Lanka Railways.  Although it does not yet operate its own trains for scheduled services, it operates carriages that are attached to trains operated by Sri Lanka Railways.

Overview

Although Blue Line Express carriages are attached to Sri Lanka Railways-operated trains, Blue Line provides on-board services and markets it as a separate operation. The service is aimed at middle and upper middle-income and tourist markets.  Sri Lanka Railways generates revenue by charging Blue Line a standard first-class fare per seat.  Blue Line charges an additional premium on its passengers beyond the standard fare to provide its services.

History 
The Blue Line Company launched Rajadhani Express on 1 October 2011, with its first service on a Kandy intercity train.  On the same day, a competing service was launched by Expolanka, called ExpoRail. Eventually, they stopped the service because of contract agreement delays from the Government. On 1 March 2019, The service started to Kandy with a new name(Blue Line Express)and updated carriages.

Services 
Blue Line Express serves one route, on  the upcountry rail line in Sri Lanka.

Rolling stock 

Blue  Line Express uses Romanian-built ASTRA passenger coaches.  Imported by Sri Lanka Railways in the 1990s, they were refurbished in 2011-2012 to Blue Line's specifications. They were painted gold and blue to suit the name change from "Rajadhani" to "Blue Line Express" in 2019.

See also 
 ExpoRail, Rajadhani's main competitor, serving a similar niche market

References 

Railway companies of Sri Lanka
Transport companies of Sri Lanka
Railway services introduced in 2011